James Alfred Lill (born 4 June 1933) is an English former professional footballer who played in the Football League for Mansfield Town.

References

1933 births
Living people
English footballers
Association football forwards
English Football League players
Mansfield Town F.C. players